"The English Way" was the first single to be taken from Fightstar's third studio album, Be Human. It was released on 3 November 2008.

Frontman, Charlie Simpson, described the song's meaning as wanting England to be more patriotic, as he believes it has lost its pride and traditional values.

The song debuted at No. 62 in the UK Singles Chart and at No. 2 in the UK Independent Label Chart.  The music video for the release proved a success, making both the No. 1 spot on the most requested charts on Scuzz and Kerrang! television stations.

Track listing
CD
 "The English Way"
 "Colours Bleed" (Album demo)

iTunes bundle
 "The English Way"
 "Hide and Seek" (Imogen Heap cover)
 "The English Way (Acoustic)"
 "The English Way (Music video)"

7" vinyl
 "The English Way"
 "Drown"

Chart performance

Personnel
Fightstar
 Charlie Simpson — lead vocals, rhythm guitar, keyboard
 Alex Westaway — vocals, lead guitar
 Dan Haigh — bass guitar
 Omar Abidi — drums, percussion
 Caius Fitzgerald, Luke Bowen, Andrew Armstrong, Josh Rees-Jones — choir vocals

Additional
 Produced by Carl Bown and Fightstar
 Engineered by Chris Potter
 Mixed by Carl Bown
 Recorded at Treehouse Studios, West Sussex, England.
 Artwork by Ryohei Hase

References

External links
 The English Way official video on YouTube.

Fightstar songs
2008 singles
Songs written by Charlie Simpson
Songs written by Alex Westaway
2008 songs